Circle dance, or  chain dance, is a style of social dance done in a circle, semicircle or a curved line to musical accompaniment, such as rhythm instruments and singing, and is a type of dance where anyone can join in without the need of partners. Unlike line dancing, circle dancers are in physical contact with each other; the connection is made by hand-to-hand, finger-to-finger or hands-on-shoulders, where they follow the leader around the dance floor. Ranging from gentle to energetic, the dance can be an uplifting group experience or part of a meditation.

Being probably the oldest known dance formation, circle dancing is an ancient tradition common to many cultures for marking special occasions, rituals, strengthening community and encouraging togetherness. Circle dances are choreographed to many different styles of music and rhythms. Modern circle dance mixes traditional folk dances, mainly from European or Near Eastern sources, with recently choreographed ones to a variety of music both ancient and modern. There is a growing repertoire of new circle dances to classical music and contemporary songs.

Distribution

Modern circle dancing is found in many cultures, including Arabic (Levantian and Iraqi), Israeli (see Jewish dance and Israeli folk dancing),Luri, Assyrian, Kurdish, Turkish, Armenian, Azerbaijani, Maltese, and Balkan. It also found in South Asia such as Nati of Himachal Pradesh, Harul of Uttarakhand, Wanvun of Kashmir, Jhumair of Jharkhand and Fugdi of Goa. Despite its immense reputation in the Middle East and southeast Europe, circle dancing also has a historical prominence in Brittany, Catalonia and Ireland to the west of Europe, and also in South America (Peruvian), Tibet, and with Native Americans (see ghost dance). It is also used, in its more meditative form, in worship within various religious traditions including the Church of England and the Islamic Haḍra Dhikr (or Zikr) dances.

History

Balkans

Medieval tombstones called "Stećci" (singular "Stecak") in Bosnia and Hercegovina, dating from the end of the 12th century to the 16th century, bear inscriptions and figures which look like dancers in a chain. Men and women are portrayed dancing together holding hands at shoulder level but occasionally the groups consist of only one sex.

In Macedonia, near the town of Zletovo, the murals on the monastery of Lesnovo (Lesnovo Manastir), which date from the 14th century, show a group of young men linking arms in a round dance. A chronicle from 1344 urges the people of the city of Zadar to sing and dance circle dances for a festival. However, a reference comes from Bulgaria, in a manuscript of a 14th-century sermon, which called chain dances "devilish and damned."

Central Europe

The circle dance of Germany is called "Reigen"; it dates from the 10th century, and may have originated from devotional dances at early Christian festivals. Dancing around the church or a fire was frequently denounced by church authorities which only underscores how popular it was. One of the frescos (dating from the 14th century) in Tyrol, at Runkelstein Castle, depicts Elisabeth of Poland, Queen of Hungary leading a chain dance. Circle dances were also found in Czech Republic, dating to the 15th century. Dancing was primarily done around trees on the village green. In Poland as well the earliest village dances were in circles or lines accompanied by the singing or clapping of the participants.

Mediterranean

In the 14th century, Giovanni Boccaccio describes men and women circle dancing to their own singing or accompanied by musicians. One of the frescos in Siena by Ambrogio Lorenzetti painted in 1338–1340 show a group of women doing a "bridge" figure while accompanied by another woman playing the tambourine.

There are accounts of two western European travelers to Constantinople, the capital of the Ottoman Empire. In 1577, Salomon Schweigger describes the events at a Greek wedding:

Another traveler, the German pharmacist Reinhold Lubenau, was in Constantinople in November 1588 and reports on a Greek wedding in these terms:

Scandinavia

In Denmark, old ballads mention a closed circle dance which can open into a chain dance. A fresco in Ørslev church in Zealand from about 1400 shows nine people, men and women, dancing in a line. The leader and some others in the chain carry bouquets of flowers. In the case of women's dances, there may have been a man who acted as the leader. In Sweden, medieval songs often mentioned dancing. A long chain was formed, with the leader singing the verses and setting the time while the other dancers joined in the chorus.

Modern dances

Eastern Europe

Hora

The Hora dance originates in the Balkans but is also found in other countries (including Romania and Moldova). The dancers hold each other's hands and the circle spins, usually counterclockwise, as each participant follows a sequence of three steps forward and one step back. The Hora is popular during wedding celebrations and festivals, and is an essential part of social entertainment in rural areas. In Bulgaria, it is not necessary to be in a circle; a curving line of people is also acceptable.

Kolo

The Kolo is a collective folk dance common in various South Slavic regions, such as Serbia and Bosnia, named after the circle formed by the dancers. It is performed amongst groups of people (usually several dozen, at the very least three) holding each other's having their hands around each other's waists (ideally in a circle, hence the name). There is almost no movement above the waist.

Southern Europe

Kalamatianos

The Kalamatianos is a popular Greek folkdance throughout Greece and Cyprus, and is often performed at many social gatherings worldwide. As is the case with most Greek folk dances, it is danced in a circle with a counterclockwise rotation, the dancers holding hands. The lead dancer usually holds the second dancer by a handkerchief, thus allowing more elaborate steps and acrobatics.  The steps of the Kalamatianós are the same as those of the Syrtos, but the latter is slower and more stately, its beat being a steady .

Sardana

Sardana is a type of circle dance typical of Catalonia. It would usually have an experienced dancer leading the circle. The dancers hold hands throughout the dance: arms down during the curts and raised to shoulder height during the llargs. The dance was originally from the Empordà region, but started gaining popularity throughout Catalonia during the 20th century. There are two main types, the original Sardana curta (short Sardana) style and the more modern Sardana llarga (long Sardana).

Syrtos

Syrtos and Kalamatianos are Greek dances done with the dancers in a curving line holding hands, facing right. The dancer at the right end of the line is the leader. The leader can also be a solo performer, improvising showy twisting skillful moves as the rest of the line does the basic step. In some parts of Syrtos, pairs of dancers hold a handkerchief from its two sides.

Western Europe

An Dro

An Dro, meaning "the turn", is a Breton circle dance. The dancers link the little fingers in a long line, swinging their arms, whilst moving to their left. The arm movements consist first of two circular motions going up and back followed by one in the opposite direction. The leader (person at the left-hand end of the line) will lead the line into a spiral or double it back on itself to form patterns on the dance floor, and allow the dancers to see each other.

Faroese chain dance

The Faroese chain dance is the national circle dance of the Faroe Islands. The dance originated in medieval times, and survived only in the Faroe Islands, while in other European countries it was banned by the church, due to its pagan origin. The dance is danced traditionally in a circle, but when a lot of people take part in the dance they usually let it swing around in various wobbles within the circle. The dance in itself only consists in holding each other's hands, while the dancers form a circle, dancing two steps to the left and one to the right without crossing the legs. When more and more dancers join the dance vine, the circle starts to bend and forms a new one within itself.

Sacred Circle Dance

The Sacred Circle Dance was brought to the Findhorn Foundation community in Scotland by Bernhard Wosien; he presented traditional circle dances that he had gathered from across Eastern Europe. Colin Harrison and David Roberts and Janet Rowan Scott took the dances to other parts of the United Kingdom where they started regular groups in south east England, then across Europe, the US and elsewhere. The network extends also to Australia, New Zealand, South Africa, South America, and India. A small centrepiece of flowers or other objects is often placed at the centre of the circle to help focus the dancers and maintain the circular shape. Much debate goes on within the sacred circle dance network about what is meant by 'sacred' in the dance.

Middle East

Dabke

Dabke is popular in Lebanon, Syria, Palestine, Israel, Jordan and Turkey. The most famous type of the dance is the Al-Shamaliyya. It consists of a lawweeh at the head of a group of men holding hands and formed in a semicircle. The lawweeh is expected to be particularly skilled in accuracy, ability to improvise, and quickness (generally light on his feet). The dancers develop a synchronized movement and step, and when the singers finish their song the lawweeh breaks from the semicircle to dance on their own. The lawweeh is the most popular and familiar form of dabke danced for happy family celebrations.

Govend

Govend is one of the most famous traditional Kurdish dances. It is distinguished from other Middle Eastern dances by being for both men and women.

Khigga

Khigga is the one of main styles of Assyrian folk dance in which multiple dancers hold each other's hands and form a line or a circle. It is usually performed at weddings and joyous occasions. Khigga is the first beat that is played in welcoming the bride and groom to the reception hall. There are multiple foot patterns that dancers perform. The head of the khigga line usually dances with a handkerchief with beads and bells added to the sides so it jingles when shaken. A decorated cane is also used at many Assyrian weddings. Moreover, the term khigga is used to denote all the Assyrian circle dances.

Kochari

Kochari is an Armenian folk dance, danced today by Armenians, Assyrians, Azerbaijanis, Kurds, Pontic Greeks and Turks. Dancers form a closed circle, putting their hands on each other's shoulders. More modern forms of Kochari have added a "tremolo step," which involves shaking the whole body. In Azerbaijan, the dance consists of slow and rapid parts, and is of three variants. There is a consistent, strong double bounce. Pontic Greeks dance hand-to-shoulder and travel to the right.

Tamzara

Tamzara is an Armenian, Assyrian, and Greek folk dance native to Anatolia. There are many versions of Tamzara, with slightly different music and steps, coming from the various regions and old villages in Anatolia. Firstly they take three steps forwards, tap their left feet on the ground, and step forward to stand on the left foot; then they take three small steps back and repeat the actions a little faster. Like most Anatolian folk dances, Tamzara is done with a large group of people with interlocked little fingers.

prevalent in south Asia in Himachal Pradesh, Kashmir,

South Asia
Circle dance is prevalent in Himalaya region of North-west India and Central India. Some circle dance of South Asia are Nati of Himachal Pradesh, Harul of Uttarakhand, Wanvun of Kashmir, folk dance of Kalash people of Chitral District, Jhumair dance of Jharkhand and Fugdi dance of Goa.

See also

 International folk dance
 Bunny hop

References

Journals

 Drumbeat, the South African circle dancing journal.
 Grapevine, the quarterly journal of Circle Dance Friends. ISSN 1752-4660

Further reading 

 Laura Hellsten, Laura (2021) Through the Bone and Marrow - Re-examining Theological Encounters with Dance in Medieval Europe. Brepols.
 Kathryn Dickason (2020) Ringleaders of Redemption - How Medieval Dance Became Sacred. Oxford University Press.
 Lynn Frances and Richard Bryant-Jefferies (1998) The Sevenfold Circle: self awareness in dance, Findhorn Press. 
 Marion Violets Gibson (2006) Dancing on Water, printed in Wales. 
 Matti Goldschmidt, The Bible in Israeli Folk Dances, Ed. Choros
 Judy King, The Dancing Circle, volumes 1–4, Sarsen Press, Winchester, England
 Iris J Stewart (2000) Sacred Woman Sacred Dance: Awakening spirituality through movement and ritual, Inner Traditions, USA 
 Bernhard Wosien, Journey of a Dancer (2016) Sarsen Press, Winchester, England.
 Maria-Gabriele Wosien, Sacred Dance: Encounter with the Gods (1986) [1974] Thames and Hudson.

External links

Folk dance
Middle Eastern dances
European folk dances
Group dances
 
Social dance